Storm King State Park is a  state park in Orange County, New York. The park is in the southeast part of the Town of Cornwall, next to the Hudson River. A central feature of the park is Storm King Mountain.

History
New York physician Ernest Stillman donated the park's initial  to the Palisades Interstate Park Commission in 1922, hoping to protect land surrounding the Storm King Highway. The park has since grown to its current  size through additional donations and purchases of land.

The park was the focus of preservation efforts in the early 1960s after a proposal by Consolidated Edison to build a hydro-electric power plant on the property. The Scenic Hudson Preservation Conference was formed by citizens opposed to the project, and the proposal was eventually dropped following a 17-year battle to preserve the park's natural state.

A 1999 forest fire at the park caused the detonation of unexploded ordnance that had been fired over 100 years prior by a cannon manufacturer across the river. Additional unexploded shells were also discovered that likely originated from a nearby West Point artillery range. After the fire was put out, the park remained closed to hikers for three years as remaining explosives were located and removed.

Description
Storm King State Park is undeveloped except for limited parking and trails. The park offers hiking and seasonal deer hunting. Several named trails are included within the park, which features Storm King Mountain as a central feature.

The park's forests are part of the Northeastern coastal forests ecoregion.

See also
 List of New York state parks

References

External links
 New York State Parks: Storm King State Park
 New York-New Jersey Trail Conference: Storm King State Park

Palisades Interstate Park system
Cornwall, New York
Highlands, New York
U.S. Route 9W
Protected areas of the Hudson Highlands
Parks in Orange County, New York
State parks of New York (state)
1922 establishments in New York (state)
Protected areas established in 1922